The Influence of a Child is a 1913 film featuring Noah Beery, Marie Falls, David Galley, Adelaide Lawrence, and Stephen Purdee.  This extremely early short drama is notable as the first screen appearance of Noah Beery Sr., who portrays a burglar who takes a friend along to assist him in the robbery of a local saloon, which soon becomes a catastrophe.

External links

1913 films
American silent short films
1913 drama films
1913 short films
Silent American drama films
American black-and-white films
1910s American films